Victor Gonzalez is an American television director.

He began his career as camera operator on the sitcom ALF. He continued to camera operate for many years on the sitcoms Roseanne, Married... with Children, Home Improvement, Reba and That's So Raven.

He made his directorial debut on the Telemundo sitcom Los Beltrán in 2000. He then went on to direct episodes of Half & Half, George Lopez, Wizards of Waverly Place, Pair of Kings, I'm in the Band, A.N.T. Farm, Rules of Engagement, Lab Rats, Level Up, Kickin' It, Jessie, See Dad Run, Wendell & Vinnie, Instant Mom, The Thundermans, Mike & Molly, Last Man Standing and Man with a Plan. He has also directed The Wizards Return: Alex vs. Alex, a special episode based on a Disney Channel series, Wizards of Waverly Place and two episodes of the Netflix series Mr. Iglesias.

Filmography

References

External links

American television directors
Living people
Place of birth missing (living people)
Year of birth missing (living people)